Alecky Blythe is a British playwright and screenwriter. She has written several plays, including the acclaimed 2011 musical London Road.

Her first play Come Out Eli won a Time Out Award. The Girlfriend Experience premiered at the Royal Court and then transferred to the Young Vic in 2009. Do We Look Like Refugees? won a Fringe First Award at the 2010 Edinburgh Festival. London Road opened at the National Theatre's Cottesloe Theatre in 2011 to widespread acclaim. It was named Best Musical at the Critics' Circle Awards and transferred to the National's larger Olivier stage in 2012. Her subsequent play, Have I Been All My Life?, opened at the New Vic Theatre in April 2012.

In other work, Blythe took part in Headlong Theatre's production of Decade at St Katherine's Docks. She wrote and co-directed a BBC2 documentary on the London riots. She is also working on a film script.

Blythe is best known for her pioneering work in verbatim theatre. Her theatre company Recorded Delivery was set up in 2003 to advance this branch of theatre.

In 2014, Blythe's Little Revolution was produced at the Almeida Theatre. Blythe acted as a version of herself, and the cast included Ronni Ancona and Imogen Stubbs.

In June 2021, the National Theatre announced that it would stage a co-production of Our Generation with Chichester Festival Theatre early in 2022, a work based on interviews about the lives of 12 young British people, directed by the latter's artistic director Daniel Evans.  The interviews took place over a period of 5 years and the 12 young people from across the UK including Belfast, Birmingham, East of England, Glasgow, London and North Wales.

References

British dramatists and playwrights
British screenwriters
Living people
Year of birth missing (living people)